The 2012 Valencia GP2 Series round was the sixth round of the 2012 GP2 Series season. It was held on June 22–24, 2012 at Valencia Street Circuit, Valencia, Spain. The race was used to support the 2012 European Grand Prix.

Classification

Qualifying

Notes:
 — Esteban Gutiérrez, Davide Valsecchi and Johnny Cecotto Jr. were each handed a three grid position penalty and Simon Trummer was dropped two places, having impeded other competitors during the qualifying session.

Feature race

Notes:
 — Davide Valsecchi had 20 seconds added to his race time after he was judged to have overtaken during a safety car period.
 — Barwa Addax drivers, Josef Král and Johnny Cecotto Jr. were excluded from the race results, after they were each given tyres which were allocated to the other at the pit stop.

Sprint race

Notes:
 — Jolyon Palmer and Rodolfo González were both handed a ten place grid position penalty for causing separate collisions during Feature Race.

Standings after the round

Drivers' Championship standings

Teams' Championship standings

 Note: Only the top five positions are included for both sets of standings.

See also 
 2012 European Grand Prix
 2012 Valencia GP3 Series round

References

Valencia
Valencia